Jayna Altman is a former beauty queen who competed in the Miss International (USA) pageant.

Biography
Altman won the Miss Missouri International 2008 title in a state competition. It was her first attempt at the title. She went on to represent Missouri in the Miss International 2008 pageant, which she won, in addition to winning the fitness preliminary award. She was also selected as Miss Congeniality, an award given to the delegate who most "exemplifies the spirit and grace of the pageant”, as chosen by contestant ballot vote.

Titles
 Miss International (USA) 2008
 Miss Missouri International (USA) 2008

References

External links
 Profile on Miss International Official website

Living people
American beauty pageant winners
Year of birth missing (living people)